Carstairs is a town in central Alberta, Canada. The closest neighbouring communities are the towns of Didsbury and Crossfield. Carstairs is located entirely within the rural Mountain View County.

Named after Carstairs, Scotland, Carstairs began life as a loading platform on the railway connecting Calgary to Edmonton. The first post office opened in 1900. The first school district was established in 1901.

Demographics 

Transportation 
First Student Canada provides commuter bus service to Calgary from Didsbury and Carstairs. The service loads commuters at the Carstairs Curling Club.

Amenities 

Carstairs is home to an 18-hole golf course, a Memorial Complex with abundant parks and playgrounds, and Tourist Information Center. Carstairs has historically been an agricultural community, as it once had seven grain elevators. It celebrates each year with the CARA Rodeo in July, Beef & Barley Days, the High School Rodeo in September, 4-H Calf Show and Sale, Bull-A-Rama, Horticultural Show, and Pumpkin Festival.

There are seven churches in the town, including the Carstairs Church of God, St. Agnes Catholic Church, and the Carstairs Bancroft United Church. One of the churches is being used as a museum that often has religious services.

History of Carstairs 
The origins of the Town of Carstairs dates back centuries to a network of trails collectively known as the Ancient Trail (also referred to as The Old North Trail and the Wolf Track). This important transportation corridor passed through the Carstairs area.  Several prominent rock formations along river and creek beds were found in the district, and these were known resting and stopping sites for First Nations people as they moved up-and-down this corridor.

As the fur trade developed and settlement grew, the newcomers to the region adopted the same network of trails that had been used for centuries.  In 1883, one of those newcomers, Sam Scarlett, set up a Stopping House at one of the prominent rock formations along the Rosebud River.  "Scarlett's" became an important and popular stop along the Calgary Edmonton Trail - frequented by freighters, the NWMP, military and the various stage coach lines.

When the Calgary & Edmonton Railway arrived in 1890, the surveyors made an allotment for a siding, station house, and townsite to be built in relative proximity to Scarlett's Stopping House.  However, to avoid crossing the Rosebud River at that point, the rail line was laid approximately 4 km west of Scarlett's.

Named 'Carstairs' the new townsite's development started off slowly, but by the turn of the 20th century, the area began a steady growth pattern that allowed it to be officially recognized as Carstairs, NWT on May 15, 1903.  The name changed to Carstairs, Alta in 1905 when Alberta received official Provincial status.

Notable people 
 Tony Stiles former professional hockey player and member of Canadian Olympic Hockey team

See also 
List of communities in Alberta
List of towns in Alberta

References

External links 

1903 establishments in the Northwest Territories
Populated places established in 1903
Mountain View County
Towns in Alberta